Those Were the Hits is a 2014 greatest hits album by the Leningrad Cowboys. It was released 4 April 2014.

Track listing

References

2014 greatest hits albums
Leningrad Cowboys albums